Dr Michael Joseph Holland (born 24 September 1957) is an Australian politician and former obstetrician in Southern NSW. He is a member of the Australian Labor Party (ALP) and was elected at the 2022 Bega state by-election for the New South Wales Legislative Assembly

Dr Holland is an obstetrician and gynaecologist who resigned from the Southern NSW Local Health District over concerns around maternity practices at Moruya Hospital. In 2021 he was preselected to run for the Labor Party in the 2022 Bega state by-election, held following the resignation of Liberal MP Andrew Constance. He won the seat on 14 February 2022.

Early life and education 
Dr Holland first grew up in Bankstown, Sydney where he lived above a pub managed by his parents for five years. From early on, he experienced the effects of alcohol abuse and domestic violence within his family. He attended Waverley College from 1966 to 1975 where he was Head Prefect and College Captain. He represented the college in the First XV in rugby and Second XI in cricket. He was awarded the J.J.O’Brien Prize for Leadership, Study & Sport. Dr Holland represented the CAS First XV and NSW Schools Rugby. He completed a Bachelor of Medicine and Bachelor of Surgery at University of New South Wales graduating in 1981. He represented UNSW Rugby in First Grade and Combined Australian Universities Rugby XV.

Career 
Dr Holland trained at St George Hospital, Sydney and at the West Middlesex Hospital in London obtaining Fellowship of the Royal Australian and New Zealand College of Obstetrics and Gynaecology in 1991. He started working as a Visiting Medical Officer (VMO) at the John Hunter Hospital in Newcastle for 10 years. During this time Michael participated as a consultant in the NSW Perinatal Transfer Advisory Service. In 2003, he started work at the Moruya District Hospital, for which he would stay at for nearly 20 years. While working in Moruya, he would eventually reach District Lead Obstetrics and Gynaecology at the Southern NSW Local Health District in 2020 but would later resign due to a review into maternity services 'completely ignoring the root cause of our unsafe neo natal services...that is, the Southern NSW LHD...are failing to provide paediatric services to the largest rural maternity service in our region'.
He is Senior Lecturer (Clinical) at Australian National University, Canberra.
Former Chair of Eurobodalla Perioperative Services Committee, Dr Holland was the VMO representative on the Eurobodalla Health Service Clinical Services Planning Committee, a member of Master Planning Committee and Project User Groups Maternity, Neonatal, Paediatric and Perioperative services for the new Eurobodalla hospital development, a member of the SNSWLHD Medical Executive Staff Council and the Eurobodalla Medical Staff Council.

Politics 
Dr Holland was elected in the 2022 Bega state by-election, with a 12.57% swing, following the resignation of Liberal MP Andrew Constance. He is the first representative for Bega to be a member of the Australian Labor Party. Dr Michael Holland advocates on health, housing affordability, mental health and regional issues.

Personal life 
Dr. Michael Holland's has spoken about the mental health issues within his family.

 Dr. Holland's father was an alcoholic after serving during WW2 and abused Dr. Holland's mother.
 Dr. Michael Holland's late brother had an alcohol addiction, mental health issues and was homeless.
 Two of Dr Michael Holland's daughters overdosed on medication due to mental health crises.
 Dr. Michael Holland has also recounted his own troubles with suicidal thoughts and depression.

References

Living people
Members of the New South Wales Legislative Assembly
Place of birth missing (living people)
21st-century Australian politicians
1957 births
Gynaecologists
Australian Labor Party members of the Parliament of New South Wales